Íþróttabandalag Ísafjarðar, commonly known as ÍBÍ, was a sports union in Ísafjörður, Iceland, best known for its football teams. In 2000, ÍBÍ merged with Héraðssamband Vestur-Ísfirðinga to form Héraðssamband Vestfirðinga.

Football

Men's football
ÍBÍ's men's football team was founded in 1955 and participated in the Icelandic top-tier league in 1962, 1982 and 1983. It folded prior to the 1988 season due to financial difficulties and most of the players transferred over to Boltafélag Ísafjarðar.

Honours
1. deild karla:
 Winners (1): 19611
 Runner-up: (1): 19811
1 Then known as 2. deild karla
2. deild karla:
 Winners (1): 19731
 Runner-up: (1): 19691
1 Then known as 3. deild karla

Managers
 Gísli Magnússon 1973
 Gísli Magnússon 1978
 Martin Wilkinson 1983
 Gísli Magnússon 1984–1985
 Jón Oddsson 1986
 Helgi Ragnarsson 1987

Women's football
ÍBÍ's women´s team was founded in 1981 and participated in the Football Cup that year. It competed in the Icelandic top-tier league in 1984 and 1985. It won the second-tier league in 1987 but the club folded just before the 1988 season and most of the players moved to BÍ which took its spot in the top-tier league.

Honours
1. deild kvenna:
Winners (1): 19871
Runner-up (1): 19831
1 Then known as 2. deild kvenna

Managers
 Jóhann Torfason 1981
 Þór Albertsson 1982
 Bjarni Jóhannsson 1983
 Rósa Áslaug Valdimarsdóttir 1984
 Jóhann Torfason 1985
 Jón E. Haraldsson 1986–1987

References

 
Football clubs in Iceland